Chile-Dominican Republic relations refers to the bilateral relations between the Republic of Chile and The Dominican Republic. Chile operates an embassy in Santo Domingo and Dominican Republic operates an embassy in Santiago.

History
In 1866, the DR recognized the legitimacy of Chile government and formally reached out to them. On May 14 1867, Álvaro Covarrubias Ortúzar, Minister of Foreign Affairs for Chile, established formal relations with the Dominican Republic by creating a consulate in Santo Domingo. In 2018, Chilean Foreign Minister Roberto Ampuero visited Santo Domingo to discuss developing economic cooperation and bolstering commercial development between both nations.

Tourism
110,000 Chileans visited Dominican Republic for tourism in 2019, becoming one of the largest groups of tourists to the country. There are direct flights between Santiago and Punta Cana with LATAM Chile.

Trade
Chilean exports to the DR have increased from US$28 million to US$78 million from 2000 to 2018. Dominican Republic exported US$11.3 million worth of goods to Chile in 2019, with the largest export being hard liquor. Chile, in the same year, exported US$76.5 million to the DR, with the largest exports being cars.

Immigration
17,959 Dominicans lived in Chile as of 2019.

See also 

 Foreign relations of Chile
 Foreign relations of the Dominican Republic

Notes and references 

Chile–Dominican Republic relations
Dominican Republic
Bilateral relations of the Dominican Republic